Kinyarwanda, Rwandan or Rwanda, officially known as Ikinyarwanda, is a Bantu language and the national language of Rwanda. It is a dialect of the Rwanda-Rundi language that is spoken in Burundi and adjacent parts of the Democratic Republic of the Congo, Uganda (where there is a dialect known as Rufumbira or Urufumbira) and Tanzania. Kinyarwanda is universal among the native population of Rwanda and is mutually intelligible with Kirundi, the national language of neighbouring Burundi. Kinyabwishya and Kinyamulenge are mutually intelligible dialects spoken in the North Kivu and South Kivu provinces of neighbouring DR Congo.

In 2010, the Rwanda Academy of Language and Culture (RALC) was established to help promote and sustain Kinyarwanda. The organization attempted an orthographic reform in 2014, but it was met with pushback due to their perceived top-down and political nature, among other reasons.

Geographic distribution
Kinyarwanda is spoken in Rwanda, Burundi, the Democratic Republic of the Congo, Uganda and Tanzania. It is also spoken by some Rwandans in Kenya.
Rufumbira, Fumbira or Urufumbira, spoken by the Bafumbira of the Kisoro District of Uganda, is a dialect of Kinyarwanda.

Phonology

Consonants
The table below gives the consonants of Kinyarwanda.

  is only found in loanwords.
 Consonants in parentheses are allophones.

Vowels
The table below gives the vowel sounds of Kinyarwanda.

Tone
Kinyarwanda is a tonal language. Like many Bantu languages, it has a two-way contrast between high and low tones (low-tone syllables may be analyzed as toneless). The realization of tones in Kinyarwanda is influenced by a complex set of phonological rules.

Orthography

The letters 'a', 'e', or 'i' at the end of a word followed by a word starting with a vowel often follows a pattern of omission (observed in the following excerpt of the Rwandan anthem) in common speech, though the orthography remains the same. For example, Reka tukurate tukuvuge ibigwi wowe utubumbiye hamwe twese Abanyarwanda uko watubyaye berwa, sugira, singizwa iteka. would be pronounced as "Reka tukurate tukuvug' ibigwi wow' utubumiye hamwe twes' abanyarwand' uko watubyaye berwa, sugira singizw' iteka."

There are some discrepancies in pronunciation from orthographic Cw and Cy. The glides  strengthen to stops in consonant clusters. For example, rw (as in Rwanda) is normally pronounced . The differences are the following:

{| class=wikitable
! Orthog. !! Pron.
|-
| pw || 
|-
| bw || 
|-
| tw || 
|-
| dw || 
|-
| mw || 
|-
| nw || 
|-
| nyw ||  or 
|-
| fw || 
|-
| vw || 
|-
| sw || 
|-
| zw || 
|-
| shw || 
|-
| jw || 
|-
| pfw || 
|-
| tsw || 
|-
| cw || 
|-
| rw || 
|-
| py || 
|-
| by || 
|-
| ty || 
|-
| ndy || 
|-
| my || 
|-
| sy || 
|-
| ry || 
|}

Grammar

Nouns
Kinyarwanda uses 16 of the Bantu noun classes. Sometimes these are grouped into 10 pairs so that most singular and plural forms of the same word are included in the same class. The table below shows the 16 noun classes and how they are paired in two commonly used systems.

Verbs
All Kinyarwanda verb infinitives begin with ku- (morphed into k(w)- before vowels, and into gu- before stems beginning with a voiceless consonant due to Dahl's Law).  To conjugate, the infinitive prefix is removed and replaced with a prefix agreeing with the subject.  Then a tense marker can be inserted.

The class I prefixes y-/a- and ba- correspond to the third person for persons. The personal prefix n- becomes m- before a labial sound (p, b, f, v), while personal prefix tu- becomes du- under Dahl's Law.

Every regular verb has three stems: the imperfective (ending in the morpheme -a), the perfective (ending in the morpheme -:ye, which may trigger a variety of morphophonological changes in the preceding segment) and the subjunctive (ending in the morpheme -e).

According to Botne (1983), a verb may belong to any of eight Aktionsart categories, which may be broadly grouped into stative and dynamic categories.  In the immediate tense, dynamic verbs take the imperfective stem while stative verbs take the perfective stem, while both use the imperfective stem in the habitual or gnomic tense.

Simple tense/mood markers include the following:
 With the present stem:
 Present ('I do'): - (no infix)
 Present Progressive ('I am doing'): -ra- (assimilates to -da- when preceded by n)
 Habitual Past ('I used to do/was doing'):  -a- plus -ga suffixed to the verb
 Future ('I will do'): -za- 
 With the past stem:
 Polite Imperative ('Let me do'; 'please do'): - (no infix)
 Perfect ('I have done/I did'):  -a-
 Near Past ('I just did'): -ra- (assimilates to -da- when preceded by n)
 Preterite ('I did'): -ara-
 Subjunctive ('that I do/did'): -za- 

Object affixes corresponding to the noun classes of an object may be placed after the tense marker and before the verb stem:

The personal object affixes are as follows:

Causatives

Kinyarwanda employs the use of periphrastic causatives, in addition to morphological causatives.

The periphrastic causatives use the verbs -teer- and -tum-, which mean cause. With -teer-, the original subject becomes the object of the main clause, leaving the original verb in the infinitive (just like in English):

In this construction, the original S can be deleted.

With -túm-, the original S remains in the embedded clause and the original verb is still marked for person and tense:

Derivational causatives use the instrumental marker -iish-. The construction is the same, but it is instrumental when the subject is inanimate and it is causative when the subject is animate:

This morpheme can be applied to intransitives (3) or transitives (4):

However, there can only be one animate direct object. If a sentence has two, one or both is deleted and understood from context.

The suffix -iish- implies an indirect causation (similar to English have in "I had him write a paper), while other causatives imply a direct causation (similar to English make in "I made him write a paper").

One of these more direct causation devices is the deletion of what is called a "neutral" morpheme -ik-, which indicates state or potentiality. Stems with the -ik- removed can take -iish, but the causation is less direct:

{|
| -mének- || "be broken" || -mén- || "break" || -méneesh- || "have (something) broken"
|-
| -sáduk- || "be cut" || -sátur- || "cut" || -sátuz- || "have (something) cut"
|}

Another direct causation maker is -y- which is used for some verbs:

Notes

References

External links

Kinyarwanda.net Kinyarwanda–English dictionary and grammar reference
Kinyarwanda phonology case study by University of Texas
PanAfrican localisation page on Kinyarwanda and Kirundi
Kinyarwanda–English Dictionary by Betty Ellen Cox
A Kinyarwanda-English and English-Kinyarwanda Dictionary

 
Languages of Rwanda
Languages of Uganda
Rwanda-Rundi languages